Gomphus albidocarneus is a species of fungus in the genus Gomphus, family Gomphaceae. It has been recorded from tropical locales of southeastern Mexico.

References

External links

Fungi of Mexico
Fungi described in 2010
Gomphaceae
Fungi without expected TNC conservation status